Diego Collado (Latin name: Didacus Colladus; c. 1587 - 1638 or 1641) was a Christian missionary born at Miajadas, in the province of Extremadura, Spain. He entered the Dominican Order at San Esteban, Salamanca around 1600, and in 1619 went to Japan. As Christianity had already been formally outlawed by Tokugawa Ieyasu in 1614, Collado spent his time in hiding, frequently changing residences to avoid being arrested. He traveled the country, learning Japanese and proselytizing to the local population, until he was recalled to Europe in 1622. He spent the next decade challenging the monopoly of the Jesuits in ministering to Japan, and his account of the venal behavior he observed in Japan was cited by Thomas Gage, a former Dominican friar turned Protestant, as evidence of Jesuit malpractice and the conflict between Dominicans and Jesuits.

In an effort to aid the preparation of future missionaries, Collado published three books of Japanese vocabulary and grammar in 1632 while in Rome, which were the first ever to be translated into Ecclesiastical Latin. He was able to return to Asia in 1635, but faced resistance from the established Dominicans there due to his more strident views. He was ultimately rebuked in his attempts to advocate for a new mission to Japan, and was recalled to Spain. But before he could depart the Philippines, his ship capsized and he was drowned.

Works
 Señor. Fray Diego Collado de la orden de santo Domingo procurador de Japon por la dicha orden, dize, que en virtud de un breve expedido en Roma a 11 de junio del año de 1608 por la santidad de Paulo V en que da licencia para que los religiosos de las ordenes mendicantes entren en los reynos de China y Japon y los demas adyacentes por qualquier via que pueda (1626)
Ars grammaticae Iaponicae lingvae (i.e. Ars grammaticae Japonicae linguae) (Latin, 1632) (English translation)
Dictionarivm sive thesavri lingvæ Iaponicæ compendivm (i.e. Dictionarium sive thesauri linguae Japonicae compendium) (Latin and Spanish, 1632)
Niffon no Cotõbani Yô Confesion / Modus Confitendi et Examinandi (Japanese and Latin, 1632)
Historia eclesiástica de los sucesos de la cristianidad del Japón desde el año de MDCII, que entró en él la orden de predicadores hasta el de MDCXXI por el P. Hiacintho Orfanel, anadida hasta el fin del ano MDCXXII por el Padre Fray Diego Collado (Spanish, 1633)
Dictionarium linguae sinensis cum explicatione Latina et hispanica charactere sinensi et Latino (Latin and Spanish, 1632)

References

External links
 
 

16th-century births
1638 deaths
Spanish Dominicans
Missionary linguists
Spanish Roman Catholic missionaries
Roman Catholic missionaries in Japan
Spanish expatriates in Japan
17th-century Spanish people
17th-century Spanish writers